Down Upbeat is the twelfth album and the ninth studio album by Casiopea, recorded and released in 1984.

Track listing

Personnel
CASIOPEA are
Issei Noro - Electric guitar (Yamaha SG-2000 Fretless)
Minoru Mukaiya - Keyboards (Yamaha DX-1, DX-7, Roland VP-330)
Tetsuo Sakurai - Electric Bass (Yamaha BB-3000 5-strings, BB-2000)
Akira Jimbo - Drums (YAMAHA YD-9000RG, Simmons SDS-5, Zildjian Cymbals, Amdeck PCK-100)

Digital drum percussion programming by Issei Noro and Minoru Mukaiya

Production
Producer - Shunsuke Miyazumi, Issei Noro
Engineer - Rik Pekkonen
Assistant Engineer - Warren Bruleigh
Mastering - Bernie Grundman
Digital Technicians - John Butherford, David Satz
Project Co-ordinators - Jay Durgain, Edward Leaman
Designer - Kaoru Watanabe, Hiroyasu Yoshioka, Katsunori Hironaka
Photographer - Yukio Ichikawa
Remastering engineer - Kouji Suzuki (2016)

Release history

External links

References

1984 albums
Casiopea albums
Alfa Records albums